Nornagests þáttr or the Story of Norna-Gest is a legendary saga about the Norse hero Nornagestr, sometimes called Gestr, and here anglicized as Norna-Gest. Nornagests þáttr is as an episode of the Saga of Óláfr Tryggvason in the medieval Icelandic manuscript Flateyjarbók.

Summary
Norna-Gest is the son of a Danish man named Thord Thingbiter, who once dwelt on the estate of Grøning in Denmark. As he relates in the tale, when he was born, three Norns arrived and foretold the child's destiny.  Two of them gave him good gifts. However Skuld, the youngest of the Norns, deeming that the two others made rather light of her, determined to render void their promises of good fortune for the child. So she prophesied that his life was to last no longer than that of a candle standing lit beside the cradle. The eldest Norn (Urðr) instantly extinguished the flame and asked his mother to hide it well.

When Norna-Gest has grown up he becomes the care-taker of the candle and he is said to have lived for three-hundred years. He reports that he took part in the battles of Sigurd the Völsung, spent time with Ragnar Lodbrok's son Björn Ironside and his brothers, with Starkad, with the Swedish king Sigurd Hring, with King Erik at Uppsala, with King Harald Fairhair and with King Hlodver in Germany.

According to the tale, Norna-Gest visits the court of King Olaf Tryggvason at the time when Olaf is trying to convert the Norse to Christianity. In the third year of the reign of King Olaf, Norna-Gest comes into the presence of the king and asks to be admitted to his bodyguard. He is uncommonly tall and strong and somewhat stricken in years. After relating his life-story, Norna-Gest permits himself to be baptized at the king's desire, and lights the candle that the norn Skuld had prophesied about. In accordance with the prophecy, when the candle fails, Norna-Gest dies.

Analogues and adaptations
The story of Nornagest and his candle has a counterpart in Greek mythology: the story of Meleager, who was prophesied to live only as long as a certain log was unburnt.  The story is included in Ovid's Metamorphoses.

Science fiction writer Poul Anderson incorporated the story of Nornagest in The Boat of a Million Years, a collection of short stories about immortals.

Notes

References

External links
Norna-Gests þáttr in Old Norse
Nora Kershaw's 1921 Translation
Norna-Gest's Thattr in English Translation with Facing Old Norse Text
Entry in the Stories for All Time database, with a full list of manuscripts, editions, translations, and secondary literature.

Further reading
 Joseph C. Harris and Thomas D. Hill, "Gestr's 'Prime Sign': Source and Signification in Norna-Gests þáttr", Arkiv för nordisk filologi, 104 (1989), 103-22
 McDonald, Sheryl, "Pagan Past and Christian Future in Norna-Gests þáttr and Bárðar saga Snæfellsáss", Bulletin of International Medieval Research, 15-16 (2011), 164-78.
 Uspenskij, Fjodor, "The Talk of the Tits: Some Notes on the Death of Sigurðr Fáfnisbani in Norna Gests þáttr", The Retrospective Methods Network (RMN) Newsletter, 5 (2012), 10–14.

Þættir
Legendary sagas
Nibelung tradition